Sergiyevo-Posadsky District is an administrative and municipal district (raion), one of the thirty-six in Moscow Oblast, Russia. It is located in the north of the oblast. Its administrative center is the city of Sergiyev Posad. Population: 225,693 (2010 Census);  The population of Sergiyev Posad accounts for 49.3% of the district's total population.

References

Notes

Sources

Districts of Moscow Oblast